TPS Turku may refer to:
HC TPS, ice hockey team
Turun Palloseura, football team
Turun Palloseura (floorball), floorball team
Turun Palloseura (women's football), women's football team